Sib Dar (also Romanized as Sīb Dar) is a village in Muzaran Rural District, in the Central District of Malayer County, Hamadan Province, Iran. At the 2006 census, its population was 15, in 6 families.

References 

Populated places in Malayer County